Nebraska is a state located in the Midwestern United States. According to the 2020 United States Census, Nebraska is the 38th most populous state with 1,961,504 inhabitants and the 15th largest by land area spanning  of land.

Incorporated communities in Nebraska are legally classified as cities or villages depending on their population: a village is a municipality of 100 through 800 inhabitants, whereas a city must have at least 800 inhabitants. There are 529 municipalities. Of Nebraska's 529 municipalities, 147 are cities and 382 are villages.

List of municipalities

References

Nebraska-related lists